Big Brother 2001 also known as Big Brother: The Battle, was the third season of the Dutch version of Big Brother. It was broadcast by the new station Yorin. It lasted from 6 September to 30 December 2001 for a total of 114 days. The presenter was Patty Brard, the member of girl group Luv'.

Format
The format underwent some changes. Contrary to the former seasons, the viewers were only able to vote for their favorite nominee, and not for the one they wanted to leave. This system was introduced to prevent the most controversial housemates from being evicted first.

The housemates were divided into two permanent groups. One group lived in a luxurious part of the house, the other group lived in poverty. At unexpected times a battle was announced, in which the two groups could fight for the right to live on the rich half. Each group had a Captain with special duties and privileges. At any moment each participant was free to challenge his leader in a Captains-battle.

Housemates

Summary
The season started with only six housemates. The others were secluded in a villa in Spain and were only gradually introduced. Each new twosome started with a battle to determine which group they became part of. In Spain, where there were no cameras, a relationship developed between Nancy and Richard. But when Richard finally arrived in Almere, Nancy was voted out at the same time. Another contestant never made it to the real house at all. Ellen was removed from the Spanish villa because she had made disallowed telephonic contact with the outside world. Rumor said she had gained possession of the telephone by having sex with a security guard.

The first week the occupants were only visible on streaming video. The producers thought that it would be prudent to start the television broadcast in the second week, so they could save up interesting material for a jump start. But they were wrong. During that first week 9/11 happened in the United States. Because of the magnitude of the event, the housemates were informed. Antillian Aldrico, who had many friends in New York City, took the news badly and had to be removed after he started to behave confused. On the other hand, some housemates for a while had the feeling the event was not real. Even after they received newspapers and saw images, they thought they were the victim of a very cruel joke.

The outspoken personalities of this season yielded much viewing-pleasure but also many complaints about the high content of swearing, boozing and sex. Young teacher Andries ended up in bed with the transsexual Kelly, snogged with Audrey and had a sexual relationship with Diane. Before that, a very drunken Diane had forced sex with Frank. Streamwatchers who were witnesses to the event filed a complaint. However, neither the Ministry of Justice nor Big Brother took action. Housemate Gert-Jan gathered a big fanbase after he had been much maligned by the manipulative Coos and Pascal and had proposed to his girlfriend in the outside world.

The final battles, in which the last contestants had to collect the prize money, were copied from Fear Factor (another Endemol production). The lesbian beauty Sandy won the last popularity vote. Inspired by Kelly, she later used the money to pay for breast implants for her girlfriend and herself. Kelly gained a photoshoot in Playboy in which she could show off her newly gained femininity.

Nominations Table

Notes

2001 Dutch television seasons
03